John Mason (born 6 March 1974) is an English cricketer.  Mason is a right-handed batsman who bowls right-arm slow wobblers Seam bowling.John Mason, CricketArchive. Retrieved 17 August 2017.</ref>

Mason made his debut for Cumberland County Cricket Club in the 2001 Minor Counties Championship against Lincolnshire, scoring 56. He played three further Minor Counties Championship matches for Cumberland in 2002.  In his time with Cumberland, Mason played two List A matches against the Warwickshire Cricket Board the 1st round of the 2002 Cheltenham & Gloucester Trophy which was held in 2001, and against the Nottinghamshire Cricket Board in the 1st round of the 2003 Cheltenham & Gloucester Trophy which was held in 2002.  In his two List A matches, he scored 16 runs at a batting average of 16.00, with a high score of 14.  With the ball, his only List A wicket was Warwickshire Cricket Board captain Naheem Sajjad.
Outside of his List A efforts. Mason was a prolific club cricketer both on and off the field.

References

External links

1984 births
Living people
Sportspeople from Barrow-in-Furness
Cricketers from Cumbria
English cricketers
Cumberland cricketers